Magical Mystery Tours: My Life with the Beatles is a book about the Beatles that was co-authored by Tony Bramwell, childhood friend of the group and Apple Corps director, and Rosemary Kingsland. It was published by St. Martin's Griffin in 2006.

Reception
Critical reception has been positive. Entertainment Weekly praised the work, writing "Though it doesn’t drop any bombshells, Tours is a tour de force of amusing details (like the suitcase of baked beans a curry-shy Starr took with him when the Beatles jetted to India in 1968 to sit at the Maharishi's feet)." The Birmingham Post also rated the book favorably, stating "This is more that just another biography about the Beatles. It's a memoir of childhood in the post-war North and a great social commentary, as it chronicles the birth of pop culture, from Liverpool in the 1950s, London in the Swinging 1960s to the New York/L.A. scenes of today."

References

2006 non-fiction books
Books about the Beatles
Collaborative non-fiction books